The Tamil Nadu State Film Award for Best Director is given by the state government as part of its annual Tamil Nadu State Film Awards for Tamil (Kollywood) films.

List of winners
Key

See also
 Cinema of India

References

General

Specific

Actor